Susan Sherman is an American author, poet, playwright, and a founder of IKON Magazine. Sherman's poems "convey the different voices of those who have felt the pang of suffering and burning of injustice."

Biography and career 
Born in Philadelphia in 1939, Sherman grew up in California, graduated from University of California at Berkeley in philosophy and English in 1961 and received an MA from Hunter College in New York in 1967 in philosophy. She began writing poetry at Berkeley, during the years of the San Francisco Renaissance.  Her initiation into political activism began when she took part in demonstrations against the violence perpetrated on students during the House Un-American Activities police riots in San Francisco in 1960.

After Sherman moved to New York in 1961, she continued being artistically and politically active. In the 1960s she became part of the poetry scene at Les Deux Magots and Le Metro Café in the East Village and became a theater critic for The Village Voice and poetry editor of The Nation. She continued to write reviews for many newspapers and periodicals including The Women's Review of Books, Cineaste Magazine and The New York Times Book Review. In 1965, she taught at the opening of the Free University of New York (renamed the Free School) and later at the Alternate U.

Sherman was a founder and the editor of IKON magazine (first issue publication February, 1967), a journal devoted to the synthesis of art and political engagement, and the elimination of the authority of the critic as the arbiter of the creative process, and in the late 60s opened IKONbooks, an alternative bookstore which served as a cultural and movement center.

Starting in the early 60s, Sherman began writing plays. She has had twelve original plays produced at Hardware Poets Playhouse, La Mama ETC, Tribeca Labs, Good Shepherd Faith Presbyterian Church, and St. Clement's Space. Sections of her play "10 Lbs. of Ground" was shown on WCBS-TV, and her English adaptation from Spanish of Cuban playwright Pepe Carril's Shango de Ima, originally produced at La Mama ETC, was video-taped by Global Village for television. The Nuyorican Production won 11 AUDELCO awards in 1996.

In 1967, she attended the Dialectics of Liberation conference at the Roundhouse in London where she took part in a panel with Jerome Rothenberg and was a featured reader along with poets that included Allen Ginsburg. She traveled to Cuba in 1968 to participate in the Cultural Congress of Havana and returned there for an extended stay a year later.

In 1970, Sherman was one of the organizers of the Fifth Street Women's Building feminist squatters action, after which she became active in the feminist movement and the Gay Liberation Movement. In the early 1970s, she also traveled to Chile while Allende was in power. In 1975, she taught at the Feminist institute Sagaris, and in 1984 she was invited to participate in  a conference on Central America and traveled to Nicaragua with Adrienne Rich. In 1982, she revived IKON as a second series, this time as a feminist magazine which, like the first series, was dedicated to creativity and social change. After almost twenty years, she returned to Cuba in the 1990s as part of a feminist trip organized by Margaret Randall.

Her memoir of the Sixties, America's Child: A Woman's Journey through the Radical Sixties (Curbstone, November 2007) garnered critical acclaim from the New York Times Book Review, Booklist, Publishers Weekly and Lambda Book Review and numerous authors, including Grace Paley, Claribel Alegria and Chuck Wachtel, and in 2012, her new and selected poems, The Light that Puts an End to Dreams was a finalist for the Audre Lorde Lesbian Poetry Award.

From her early years in the 1980s as a part-time faculty member at The New School (Parsons School of Design and Eugene Lang College), she was active in union organizing, and has remained involved in the continuing struggle to speak to part-time faculty working conditions. Re-energized as ACT-UAW Local 7902, the union finally succeeded in their negotiations for a first contract in 2004.

Publications 
 

Susan Sherman Barcelona Journal, IKON  2007 0-945368-14-3, 978-945368-14-4

Susan Sherman Shango de Ima, English adaptation of a Cuban play by Pepe Carril, Doubleday, 1969, 1970 LCCCN 78-130887

Anthologies 

 Art on the Line: Essays by Artists about the Point Where Their Art & Activism Intersect, (ed.) Jack Hirschman. Curbstone Press: 2001 1880684772, 978-1880684771
 , Reunie par Eliot Katz et Christian Haye. Maison de la Poesie Rhone-Alpes, 1997
 Essays on the Line, ed. Jack Hirshman, Curbstone Press, 1997
 The Arc of Love, ed. Clare Coss. Scribner's, 1996 00684814469, 978-0684814469
 Poetry as Bread, ed. Martin Espada. Curbstone Press, 1994
 Lesbian Culture: An Anthology, ed. Penelope & Wolfe. Crossing Press, 1993 0895945916 978-0895945914
 Naming the Waves, ed. Christian McEwen. Crossing Press. 1988 0895943700, 978-0895943705
 An Ear to the Ground: An Anthology of Contemporary American Poetry, ed. Marie Harris and Kathleen Aguero. University of Georgia Press, 1989 0820311227, 978-0820311227
 Totem Voices: Plays from the Black World Repertory, ed. Paul Cater Harrison. Adaptation of Shango de Ima. Grove Press, 1988. 0802131263, 978-0802131263
 Ixok Amar-Go, Bilingual poetry anthology ed. Zoe Anglesey, Granite Press, 1987 0096148863, 978-0961488635

Awards 

 New York Foundation for the Arts Fellowship Creative Non-fiction Literature, 1997
 Puffin Foundation Grant, 1993
 Residency, Blue Mountain Center, Blue Mountain, New York, 1992
 New York Foundation for the Arts Fellowship, Poetry, 1990–1991
 New York State Council on the Arts' Editor's Award, 1986
 Coordinating Committee of Literary Magazines Editor's Grant, 1985
 Creative Artists Public Service Grant, Poetry, 1976–1977
 Emily Chamberlein Cook Poetry Prize, University of California, 1959–1960

References

External links
IKON magazine issue 12/13
IKON Archive

Poets & Writers
Sunday Salon

1939 births
Living people
Poets from New York (state)
American women dramatists and playwrights
American women poets
20th-century American poets
20th-century American dramatists and playwrights
21st-century American poets
21st-century American dramatists and playwrights
20th-century American women writers
21st-century American women writers
Queer writers
Lesbian writers